Adolf Fetsch  (born 1940 in Ukraine) is a Ukrainian - German politician, representative of the Christian Social Union of Bavaria.
	
He has been a Russian-German integration activist since 2003 and is chairman of the Federal Land team of Germans from Russia.

See also
List of Bavarian Christian Social Union politicians

References

Christian Social Union in Bavaria politicians
Soviet people of German descent
1940 births
Living people